Lou-Anne Gaylene Gilchrist, H.E. is the Permanent Representative to the Organization of American States and Ambassador to the United States from Saint Vincent and the Grenadines.  She was appointed on October 26, 2016.  She is also the non resident ambassador to Canada,  She succeeded La Celia Aritha Prince.  She was chair of the Permanent Council of the OAS until September 30, 2021.

Biography
She attended the University of the West Indies at Cave Hill, earning a BA in Modern Languages. From 1997 until 2009, she was a lecturer at Saint Vincent and the Grenadines, teaching Modern Languages. In 2004, she earned an MA in the subject from the University of Warwick.

Gilchrist became an education officer in 2009 at the Ministry of Education.

References

Living people
Women ambassadors
Ambassadors of Saint Vincent and the Grenadines to Canada
Ambassadors of Saint Vincent and the Grenadines to the United States
Permanent Representatives of Saint Vincent and the Grenadines to the Organization of American States
University of the West Indies alumni
Alumni of the University of Warwick
20th-century women
21st-century women
Date of birth missing (living people)
Year of birth missing (living people)
Place of birth missing (living people)